This is a partial list of hospitals in Italy.

Abruzzo 

 San Salvatore Hospital, L'Aquila
 San Fillipo and Nicola, L'Aquila
 Castel di Sangro Hospital, L'Aquila
 SS. Annunziata Hospital, L'Aquila

Aosta Valley 
Beauregard Hospital, Aosta
Saint-Martin-de-Corléans Hospital, Aosta
Umberto Parini Regional Hospital, Aosta

Apulia 

 Policlinico of Bari, Bari
 Anthea Hospital, Bari
 Vito Fazzi Hospital, Lecce
 Casa Sollievo della Sofferenza, San Giovanni Rotondo
 Cardinale Giovanni Panico General Hospital, Tricase

Basilicata

Calabria 
 Ospedali Riuniti Bianchi-Melacrino-Morelli,  Reggio Calabria

Campania 

 Ospedale G. Capilupi Capri, Anacapri
 Antonio Cardarelli Hospital, Naples
 Ospedale degli Incurabili, Naples
 Ospedale Evangelico Villa Betania, Naples
 Ospedale Santobono, Naples
 San Gennaro dei Poveri, Naples
 U.S. Naval Hospital, Naples

Emilia-Romagna 
 Bentivoglio Hospital, Bologna
 Budrio Hospital, Bologna
 Costa Hospital, Bologna
 Don G. Dossetti Bazzano Hospital, Bologna
 Ospedale "Simiani" di Loiano, Bologna
 Ospedale Bellaria Carlo Alberto Pizzardi, Bologna
 Ospedale Maggiore Carlo Alberto Pizzardi, Bologna
 Policlinico Sant'Orsola-Malpighi, Bologna
 SS.Salvatore Hospital, Bologna
 Vergato Hospital, Bologna
Ospedale Maria Luigia, Parma
 Santa Maria Bianca Hospital, Mirandola

Friuli-Venezia Giulia 

 Burlo Garofolo Pediatric Institute, Trieste
 Santa Maria della Misericordia Hospital, Udine
 Cattinara Hospital, Trieste

Lazio 

 Agostino Gemelli University Polyclinic, Rome
 Bambino Gesù Children’s Hospital, Rome
 Concordia Hospital, Rome
 Fatebenefratelli Hospital, Rome
 Lazzaro Spallanzani National Institute for Infectious Diseases, Rome
 Rome American Hospital, Rome
 Ospedale di Santo Spirito, Rome
 Policlinico Umberto I, Rome
 San Giovanni Addolorata Hospital, Rome
 Salvator Mundi International Hospital, Rome
 Sant'Eugenio Hospital, Rome
San Benedetto Hospital, Province of Frosinone

Liguria 
 Sanremo Hospital
 Imperia Hospital
 Santa Maria di Misericordia Hospital, Albenga
 Santa Corona Hospital, Pietra Ligure
 San Paolo Hospital, Savona
 La Colletta Hospital, Arenzano
 Evangelico Hospital, Voltri, Genoa 
 Antero Micone Hospital, Sestri Ponente, Genoa
 Villa Scassi Hospital, Sampierdarena, Genoa
 Galliera Hospital, Genoa
 San Martino Hospital, Genoa
 Istituto Giannina Gaslini, Genoa
 Sant'Antonio Hospital, Recco
 Lavagna Hospital
 Sestri Levante Hospital
 Sant'Andrea Hospital, La Spezia

Lombardy 

 European Institute of Oncology, Milan
 Fatebenefratelli and Oftalmico Hospital, Milan
 Luigi Sacco Hospital, Milan
 Macedonio Melloni Hospital, Milan
 Mombello Psychiatric Hospital, Monza and Brianza
 Ospedale Niguarda Ca' Granda, Milan
 Pio Albergo Trivulzio, Milan
 Policlinico of Milan, Milan
 San Carlo Hospital, Milan
 San Paolo Hospital, Milan
 San Raffaele Hospital, Milan
 Vittore Buzzi Children's Hospital, Milan
 Humanitas Research Hospital, Milan
 Instituti Clinici Scientifici Maugeri, Pavia
 Policlinico San Matteo, Pavia
 Sant'Anna Hospital, Province of Como
 Ospedale di Circolo e Fondazione Macchi, Varese

Marche

Molise 
 John Paul II Foundation for Research and Treatment, Campobasso
 Ospedale Ferdinando Veneziale di Isernia, Isernia

Piedmont 
 CTO Hospital, Turin

Sardinia

Sicily 
 ISMETT, Palermo

Trentino-South Tyrol

Tuscany 
 Hospital of Santa Maria Nuova, Florence
 Meyer Children's Hospital, Florence
 Misericordia Hospital, Grosseto
 Cisanello Hospital, Pisa
 Santa Chiara Hospital, Pisa
 Santa Maria alle Scotte Hospital, Siena

Umbria

Veneto

See also
History of hospitals
:Category:Defunct hospitals in Italy

Italy
 List
Hospitals
Italy